The Question is a superhero appearing in American comic books published by DC Comics. Created by Steve Ditko, the Question first appeared in Charlton Comics' Blue Beetle #1 (June 1967), and was acquired by DC Comics in the early 1980s and incorporated into the DC Universe.

The Question's secret identity was originally Vic Sage, later retconned as Charles Victor Szasz. However, after the events of the 2006–2007 miniseries 52, Sage's protégé Renee Montoya took up his mantle and became his successor. Following The New 52 relaunch, Sage was reintroduced as a mystical entity, then government agent, before being restored to his traditional detective persona and name after the events of DC Rebirth.

As conceived by Ditko, The Question was an adherent of Objectivism during his career as a Charlton hero, much like Ditko's earlier creation, Mr. A. In the 1987–1990 solo series from DC, the character developed a Zen-like philosophy. Since then, he has fluctuated in philosophical stance depending on the writer, but maintains a conspiratorial mindset and distrust of authority.

Publication history
In 1967, Steve Ditko created the character of Mr. A, whom he conceived as an undiluted expression of his values, ethics and Objectivist philosophy. Later that year, Ditko was hired by Charlton Comics to revive their superhero character Blue Beetle. Due to their below-average per-page payment rates to artists, Charlton tended to give more creative freedom to artists who wished to pursue offbeat or idiosyncratic ideas. Ditko therefore decided to create the Question as a less-radical version of Mr. A who could be acceptable to the Comics Code Authority. The character was included as a back-pages feature in the new Blue Beetle comic book.

However, Charlton discontinued its "action hero" line in December 1967 after only four issues of Blue Beetle had been published. A three-part Question story, which Ditko had already penciled, appeared in the one-shot comic book Mysterious Suspense (October 1968). The fifth and final issue of Blue Beetle, featuring the Question, was published in November of the same year. In 1985, after DC Comics had acquired the right to Charlton's characters, the Question reappeared in Crisis on Infinite Earths. In February 1987, DC launched a new The Question comic book, scripted by Dennis O'Neil and penciled by Denys Cowan. This series, which ran for 36 regular issues and two annuals, was replaced in September 1990 by The Question Quarterly, which ran for five issues. The Question has since then remained a recurring character of the DC Universe. A six-issue The Question limited series was published by DC in 2005. A four-issue limited series titled The Question: The Deaths of Vic Sage was published under the DC Black Label imprint beginning in 2019, written by Jeff Lemire and penciled by Cowen and covers by Bill Sienkiewicz. 

Aside from appearing in his own titles, The Question has appeared sporadically in DC comics and media and has undergone several reboots.

Fictional character biography

Charlton Comics
Based in Hub City, Vic Sage made his mark as a highly outspoken and aggressive investigative journalist. Not long after starting his TV appearances, he began to investigate Dr. Arby Twain.

Sage was approached by Aristotle Rodor, his former professor, currently a scientist. Rodor told Sage about an artificial skin he had co-developed with Dr. Twain called Pseudoderm. Pseudoderm was intended to work as an applied skin-like bandage with the help of a bonding gas, but it had unforeseen toxicity which was sometimes fatal when applied to open wounds. Rodor and Twain agreed to abandon the project and parted ways, but Professor Rodor discovered that Dr. Twain had decided to proceed with an illegal sale of the invention to Third World nations, regardless of the risk to human health.

Sage resolved to stop him but had no way of going after Dr. Twain without exposing himself. Rodor suggested that Sage use a mask made of Pseudoderm to cover his famous features. Armed with information, and more importantly a disguise, Sage eventually caught up with Dr. Twain, stopping the transaction and extracting a confession, then leaving Twain bound in Pseudoderm. On television, Sage reported on Dr. Twain's illegal activities.

Sage decided that this new identity would be useful for future investigations, and partnered with Professor Rodor, who supplied the Pseudoderm and eventually modified the bonding gas to change the color of Sage's hair and clothing. The two men became good friends, with Sage affectionately referring to Rodor as "Tot".

Compared to other superhero characters of the Silver Age of Comic Books, The Question was more ruthless in his methods. For example, when he was fighting some criminals in a sewer and knocked them into a deep and fast-moving water flow, he declined to pull them out despite their real danger of drowning. Instead, he left to notify the police to retrieve them in case they survived the ordeal.

The Question's most frequent foe was Max Bine, a.k.a. Banshee. Introduced in Blue Beetle (vol. 4) #2 (August 1967), Bine was the apprentice of a circus performer named the Flying Dundo. After designing a cape that enabled the wearer to fly, Dundo was slain by his pupil and Max Bine became the costumed Banshee, using his mentor's invention to terrorize towns he crossed. The Banshee met his match when he reached Crown City and sparred with the Question on several occasions.

The Question briefly appeared alongside his fellow Charlton "Action Heroes" as part of the Sentinels of Justice published by AC Comics.

DC Comics
The Charlton characters were acquired by DC Comics while the former company was in decline in 1983. The Question appeared briefly in 1985's Crisis On Infinite Earths and in a three-issue arc of DC's Blue Beetle revival.

O'Neil series

DC gave the Question his own solo series in 1987, written by Dennis O'Neil and primarily drawn by Denys Cowan. The series was published for 36 issues, two annuals, and five "Quarterly" specials. In The Question #1, the Question was defeated in personal combat, first by the martial arts mercenary Lady Shiva. He was then beaten nearly to death by the villain's hired thugs, shot in the head with a pellet gun, and thrown into the river to drown. Lady Shiva then rescued him for reasons of her own and gave him directions to meet wheelchair-bound Richard Dragon as soon as he recovered enough to get out of bed. Once there, Sage learned both martial arts and eastern philosophy. When he returned to the city, he resumed his journalist and superhero careers with adventures that tended to illustrate various philosophic points. To further illustrate those ideas, Dennis O'Neil had a reading recommendation in the letters page of each issue.

In the O'Neil series, Vic Sage is an investigative reporter for the news station KBEL in Hub City. He uses the identity of the Question to get the answers his civilian identity cannot. Unlike other vigilante superheroes, O'Neil's Question is primarily focused on the politics of his city, and rather than hunting down the perpetrators of petty theft, he tends to fight the corrupt government of Hub City. O'Neil's Hub City is noted as being "synonymous with venality, corruption, and violence", perhaps even surpassing Gotham City as the most dismal city in the DC Universe-version of the US.

For the majority of the series, Vic Sage is covertly assisting the good-hearted Myra Fermin to win the seat of Hub City Mayor. His interest in Myra extends beyond admiration, as the two shared a relationship before his near-death experience with Lady Shiva and his training under Richard Dragon. Upon his return, he discovers she has married the corrupt drunkard and mayor of Hub City, Wesley Fermin. Despite Myra's losing the election by one vote, she becomes mayor when her competition is found dead as a result of what is called "the worst tornado in history". At her victory speech, her husband Wesley shoots her for supporting what he believes to be Communist beliefs, putting her into a coma and sending Hub City further into chaos with no government and no police force. Sage dons the guise of the Question, acting as the city's only form of justice for a short while before the mayor wakes from her coma. Gang warfare in the weeks following the election leads Sage to Lady Shiva, first as a combatant, and then enlisting her help as an ally of sorts to get in a position to talk to the gang leaders. As Myra adjusts into her role as mayor of Hub City, she and Sage begin to rekindle their relationship, though Myra tells Sage she will not act on her feelings until she leaves office. Despite their long-term friendship, she never connects that Sage and "the man without a face" are one and the same until the very end of his time at Hub City.

O’Neil's Question is very conflicted on how far to go in enforcing justice, often feeling tempted to kill. He resists this temptation during his time in Hub City, realizing that part of his desire to go so far is just to see what it feels like to take a life. His relationship with his mentor, Aristotle Rodor, is one of many things that keep him from going over the edge and back towards the darkness he had shown in his youth on the streets of Hub City.

Eventually, during a massive hallucinogenic trip, his subconscious tells him through images of his mother that he has to leave Hub City to ever be able to live happily. This viewpoint is bolstered by the utter societal collapse of the city. Around the same time, Richard Dragon comes to see Vic, as Richard has sensed that Vic is on the verge of a major turning point in his life, and convinces Vic that living in Hub City is killing him. In an agreement with Richard, Lady Shiva arrives with a helicopter to usher The Question and Aristotle Rodor away, at which point she decides to stay in Hub City and embrace the chaos. Vic nearly convinces Myra to come with him and escape the chaos of the city. Myra remembers the people of the city who need her, mainly the children. She leaves Jackie, her mentally handicapped daughter, in Sage's care and goes back to do what she can.

After leaving Hub City, Vic takes Jackie with him to South America, hoping to rid himself of his "No Face" alter ego and find a land free of the clutter and corruption that filled Hub City. However, Vic quickly gets drawn into a drug war which ultimately forces him to kill to save Jackie's life. This marks a major turning point in the Question's career as he thinks to himself that he didn't feel anything and would kill again if needed. Though it is not entirely clear what the Question's current view is on murder, he kills again in the 1991 The Brave and the Bold mini-series and the 2005 Question mini-series.

Jackie becomes ill and Sage returns with her to Hub City. Despite medical care, Jackie dies.

The Question Annual #2 retroactively altered the character's origin by revealing that Sage was an orphan who had been left on the steps of a Catholic church as a baby. He was given the name Charles Victor Szasz (not to be mistaken with serial killer Victor Zsasz) by the nuns who found him, and later changed his name to Vic Sage after becoming a television reporter. As a youth he developed a reputation as a troublemaker, and prided himself on defiantly enduring the physical abuse of the orphanage where he was housed. He eventually managed to get into college where he studied journalism, but his higher learning did not mellow his violent tendencies, such as when he beat up his pusher for giving him LSD which caused the frightening experience of doubting his own senses under its influence.

Veitch miniseries
The 2005 Question mini-series, authored by Rick Veitch, reimagines the character as a self-taught urban shaman whose brutal and at times lethal treatment of enemies now arises from a warrior ethos, rather than Objectivist philosophy. The Question "walks in two worlds" when sent into visionary trances by Rodor's gas, now retconned as a hallucinogen. In these trances, cities (Chicago, where he is a TV anchor, and then Metropolis, where the series takes him) "speak" to him through visual coincidences and overheard snatches of street conversation. Regarding himself as a spiritual warrior, he is now comfortable killing his enemies when this seems useful and poetically just. He uses his skills and his alternative moral code first to detect and then to foil a plot by Lex Luthor not only to assassinate Superman (using chi energy which Sage can detect) but to prevent his return from the dead (which Superman had recently achieved following his death in DC's notorious Doomsday event) by damning his soul upon death. Sage is revealed to have a lifelong infatuation with fellow journalist Lois Lane, which he does not divulge to her. Superman accepts the Question's visionary drug use, and expresses gratitude for his assistance, but forces him to leave the city after several unheeded warnings about killing, and also after noticing Sage's crush.

Interest in Huntress
During the "Cry for Blood" Huntress arc and other smaller appearances surrounding it, the Question was active in Gotham City, during which time he expressed an interest in Huntress, both romantically and in her development as a crimefighter. In an attempt to help her find peace, he takes her to his old mentor to undergo the same training he himself underwent in the O'Neil series but is frustrated by Huntress' continued acceptance of killing as a solution.

Huntress later worked closely with Sage's successor as the Question, Renee Montoya, and is saddened to hear of Sage's death. She credits him with "saving her from herself", and misses him.

"52"

The character's difficult ethical history, and the character himself were laid to rest by DC in its year-long weekly title, 52, in which Sage recruits and trains Gotham ex-cop Renee Montoya as his replacement before dying of lung cancer. In this incarnation, he is wry, cheerful and avuncular, although still enigmatic. He displays no discernible philosophical commitments, aside from a determination to recruit Montoya and to have her decide who she is and who she will become. Montoya is herself agonized over the issue of killing criminals, although her guilt is over a principled refusal to kill one, specifically the murderer of her former partner. The series' action chiefly alternates between Gotham City, where Montoya struggles to save Kate Kane from Intergang and its Crime Bible cult, and Nanda Parbat, where she trains with Sage's mentors Rodor and Dragon, and whence she later returns with Sage, too late to find him a cure for his cancer. En route there, Sage dies muttering snatches of conversations from his early comics appearances and a final invocation to Montoya to decide who she will become. After grieving, she determines to take up his mantle as the new Question.

Blackest Night
In the Blackest Night crossover, Vic Sage is reanimated as a Black Lantern. He goes after Renee, Tot, and Lady Shiva, who manage to elude him by suppressing their emotions, making them invisible to him.

After the end of Blackest Night, Sage's body is reburied in Nanda Parbat by Montoya and Saint Walker of the Blue Lanterns.

The New 52
In September 2011, The New 52 rebooted DC's continuity. In the new timeline, two versions of Vic Sage exist on the main New 52 DC Universe Earth.

Trinity of Sin Question
The first version of the New 52 Question was introduced in New 52: FCBD Special Edition. His true identity is unknown but what is known is that he was teleported from an unknown location in time and space, along with Pandora and Judas Iscariot (The Phantom Stranger), to stand trial for unstated crimes against humanity. Nothing is known of Question's true identity or past or crimes, though he claimed to have thousands of followers who he claimed would avenge him. His judges, the first seven wizards (later known as the Quintessence) who harnessed magic on Earth, punished Question by erasing his face, rendering him blind and mute. They then erased his memory and teleported him to the 21st century to spend the rest of his existence tormented by his disfigurement, forgotten, and not knowing who he was.

This version of Question resurfaced during the Trinity of Sin storyline, where he is shown investigating the Secret Society of Super-Villains. Having regained his ability to speak and see, this version of Question (initially) speaks only in questions and believes that his true identity can be restored if he can stop the Secret Society and its backers, Crime Syndicate of America members Outsider (Earth-3's Alfred Pennyworth) and triple agent Atomica.

When Atomica manipulates Superman into murdering Doctor Light by triggering his heat vision power by stabbing his brain with a sliver of kryptonite, Question breaks into the facility where Superman is being held. Using a gas mask-based setup similar to the one used by Nemesis, Question impersonates Steve Trevor and frees Superman, while presenting a lead towards who caused Superman to kill Doctor Light. The lead turns out to be a dead end, but it places Question in with the various Justice League factions when Pandora attempts to seek their help to open the skull-shaped box that various forces are coveting.

During the battle between the League factions that ensues for the box, Pandora rejects Question's desire to open the box and possibly learn his true identity. She implies that Question would be a threat to all if he ever had his memory and identity restored.

The battle between the various Leagues ends when Atomica reveals her true nature and helps Outsider open the skull box, which in truth was a pocket dimension containing the rest of the Crime Syndicate. Freed, the Crime Syndicate imprisoned this version of the Question along with the bulk of the Justice League, Justice League of America, and Justice League Dark inside the Firestorm matrix. Question and the rest of the League were freed once the Crime Syndicate and Secret Society were defeated by a group of villains united by Lex Luthor.

The character was then featured in the six-part mini-series "Trinity of Sin", but only featured in a supporting role, where he was constantly complaining about how Pandora and Phantom Stranger did not care about helping him find out his true identity. This version of the Question was last seen in Trinity of Sin #6, the final issue of the series.

Suicide Squad Vic Sage
A second version of the Question appeared in the New 52's Suicide Squad (vol. 5) #1, with no ties to the version of the Question seen in Trinity War or Trinity of Sin. This version is Vic Sage, a government agent recruited from the private sector to co-run the Suicide Squad with Amanda Waller. This version of Vic Sage is a corrupt, amoral bureaucrat who sees the Suicide Squad serving as a go-to sabotage group; engaging in wetwork assignments against foreign corporate interests under the guise of regular super-villain carnage. He also seeks to "improve" the group; dismissive of Harley Quinn and Deadshot, he recruits Deathstroke and Joker's Daughter as their replacements. He also recruits Black Manta into the group too and alters his helmet so that every person he sees is Aquaman so as to motivate him into being a more prolific killer.

Deathstroke and Joker's Daughter betray the team on their first mission headed by both Sage and Waller. Sage panics and attempts to kill the entire team to prevent the mutiny from exposing the Squad. Waller prevents this from happening and in response to his actions, Waller has Sage banished from having any active say over mission and membership selection. Sage responds by agreeing to work with a corrupt multi-national corporation, which seeks to exploit the new objectives of the team to eliminate business rivals and whistleblowers. Sage arranges for Waller to be demoted to field commander, forcing Waller and the team to go AWOL to get proof of Sage and his corporate backers' agenda. In the end, Waller agrees to give the multi-national corporation a pass in exchange for them betraying their patsy. Vic Sage is then arrested, but not before he murders Waller's assistant who tries to stop Sage from killing Waller after learning his corporate allies sold him out to save themselves.

Pax Americana Question
In Multiversity: Pax Americana, Grant Morrison recreated Question on the new Earth-4. This version of the character is more in line with Steve Ditko's Mr. A and Alan Moore's Rorschach, as he is a murderous vigilante who teams up with Blue Beetle (Ted Kord). Question refuses retirement after all super-hero activity is banned following the botched murder/resurrection of the President of the United States, which was orchestrated by the president, Captain Atom, and Peacemaker. The Question's alter ego is Vic Sage, who is a Glenn Beck-style television host whose advertisements promote his show with the advertising slogan "Vic Sage is p****ed!". Furthermore, unlike other versions of Question, the Pax Americana one wears a rubber hood that covers his entire head rather than a mask that is attached to his face.

DC Rebirth/DC Universe
Following Infinite Frontier after the event Doomsday Clock, Vic Sage as Question was re-established with his previous character history and a member of the Suicide Squad and later Checkmate.

Equipment
The Question's mask is made from Pseudoderm, a substance made by Dr. Aristotle Rodor. According to the revamps of 52, this substance was developed using technology lifted from an old Batman foe named Bart Magan (Dr. No Face) and gingold extract, a fruit derivative associated with the Elongated Man. The Question's series by Denny O'Neil presented Pseudoderm as Rodor's attempt to create an artificial skin for humanitarian purposes. The Question is able to see out clearly through his mask. In early appearances, the mask was described as containing air filters.

The Question's specialized belt buckle, which releases a binary gas that binds his mask to his skin and temporarily recolors his garb and hair, is similar to that of the Spider-Man villain Chameleon. In his initial appearances, which were drawn by Steve Ditko, the Chameleon had used a device in a belt buckle which emitted a transformation-enhancing gas. The binding element is adjusted to Sage's specific body chemistry.

The binary gas reacts with chemicals in Sage's treated clothing and hair, causing them to change color. Sage's hair would change from red to black, or later to a darker red. Sage's treated clothing would change to light blue and orange, or later to dark blue. Some later versions of the gas caused no color change whatsoever. The faceless mask, combined with the color change of clothing, was sufficient to disguise Sage's identity to most onlookers. All of Sage's clothing was similarly treated. Originally Sage favored trench coats, business suits, and fedoras. Later he expanded his treated wardrobe, giving him a less standardized look.

Early in his career, the Question used seemingly blank calling cards with a delayed chemical reaction that after a specified time caused a question mark to appear in a burst of gas. Other writing could be similarly treated to reveal itself at the pre-determined time.

While the binary gas has no other known properties, the Question often used the gas to enhance his image and intimidate criminals into confessing by implying that the gas would cause anyone exposed to it for extended periods to lose their face permanently. The New 52 version possesses the power of teleportation.

Homages
 Rorschach: Alan Moore's comic book series Watchmen was originally planned to use a number of Charlton Comics characters, including the Question. When DC, the owner of the characters, found out that he intended to kill the Question, along with a number of the other characters, he was asked to make new characters. The Question became Rorschach.
 In The Question #17, Vic picks up a copy of Watchmen to read on a trip and initially sees Rorschach as being quite cool. After Vic is beaten up trying to emulate Rorschach's brutal style of justice, he concludes that "Rorschach sucks".
 The Question was featured in Frank Miller's Batman: The Dark Knight Strikes Again as a libertarian, anti-government conspirator. Frank Miller's interpretation of Sage, as a nod to Ditko and Alan Moore, is Randian and preachy, at one point going on television for a series of humorous Crossfire-style exchanges with the Emerald Archer, Green Arrow, who is often portrayed as a liberal progressive. He is also shown as a technophobe, monitoring the dark conspiracy Batman and his allies must face, while writing on an old-fashioned typewriter.
 The Fact: In volume 2, issue #42, during Grant Morrison's run of The Doom Patrol, Flex Mentallo describes a number of his former teammates. Among them was the Fact, whose appearance and name recall those of the Question. He reappears in the Flex Mentallo miniseries.

52 Multiverse
In the final issue of 52 (2007), a new DC Multiverse is revealed, originally consisting of 52 alternate realities, including a new "Earth-4". While this new world resembles the pre-Crisis Earth-Four, including unnamed characters who look like the Question and the Charlton characters, writer Grant Morrison has stated this is not the pre-Crisis Earth-Four. Describing the conception of Earth-4, Grant Morrison alluded that its interpretation of Vic Sage would resemble the classic Charlton incarnation, with tones borrowed from Rorschach and Watchmen. A number of other alternate universes in the 52 Multiverse may also contain versions of the Question from DC Comics previous Elseworlds stories or from variant "themed" universes, such as the gender-reversed world of Earth-11.

In Grant Morrison's Multiversity series, the Vic Sage/Question is one of the core protagonists in Pax Americana, an issue of that limited series set in the New 52's Earth 4 continuity, along with the Blue Beetle, Peacemaker, Nightshade, and Captain Atom.

On Earth-9, "The Question" is the name given to a global surveillance network.

Other versions
 In the alternate timeline of Flashpoint, Question is a member of the Resistance. 

 An alternate Question appeared in the four-issue limited series titled The Question: The Deaths of Vic Sage published under the DC Black Label imprint beginning in 2019, written by Jeff Lemire and penciled by Denys Cowen and covers by Bill Sienkiewicz.

In other media

Television
 The Question appears in Justice League Unlimited, voiced by Jeffrey Combs. This version is a data broker for the Justice League and a paranoid conspiracy theorist who is distrusted and ridiculed by the other Leaguers. In his most notable appearances in the episodes "Double Date" and "Question Authority", he enters a relationship with ex-Leaguer Huntress while helping her seek revenge on Steven Mandragora in exchange for her help in investigating Project Cadmus.
 The Question appears in Batman: The Brave and the Bold, voiced by Nicholas Guest.
 The Question was intended to appear in an Arrowverse series until Marc Guggenheim revealed in December 2017 that DC Films currently has plans for the character and that the television network cannot use the character as such.

Film
 The Question appears in Scooby-Doo! & Batman: The Brave and the Bold, voiced again by Jeffrey Combs. This version is a member of the Mystery Analysts of Gotham, a detectives-only club formed by Batman.
 The Question appears in DC Showcase: Blue Beetle, voiced by David Kaye.

Video games
 The Question appears as a playable character in Lego Batman 3: Beyond Gotham, voiced by Liam O'Brien.
 The Question appears as an assist character in Scribblenauts Unmasked: A DC Comics Adventure.

Collected editions
The Steve Ditko series of The Question is featured in a hardback edition:
 Action Heroes Archives, Vol. 2 (DC Archives Edition) by Steve Ditko (author, illustrator); hardcover: 384 pages; publisher: DC Comics, 2007

The Question's 1980s series has been collected into different editions:
 The Question vol. 1: Zen and Violence (collects The Question #1–6, 176 pages, softcover, October 2007)
 The Question vol. 2: Poisoned Ground (collects The Question #7–12, 176 pages, softcover, May 2008)
 The Question vol. 3: Epitaph for a Hero (collects The Question #13–18, 176 pages, softcover, November 2008)
 The Question vol. 4: Welcome to Oz (collects The Question #19–24, 176 pages, softcover, April 2009)
 The Question vol. 5: Riddles (collects The Question #25–30)
 The Question vol. 6: Peacemaker (collects The Question #31–36, 160 pages, softcover, May 2010)
 The Question by Dennis O'Neil and Denys Cowan Omnibus Vol 1 HC (collects The Question #1-27, Green Arrow Annual #1, The Question Annual #1, Detective Comics Annual #1, 952 pages, hardcover, June 2022)

Collections featuring the Renee Montoya Question:
 The Question: Five Books of Blood (collects Crime Bible: The Five Lessons of Blood (2007–2008) #1–5, 128 pages, hardcover, June 2008)
 The Question: Pipeline (collects Detective Comics #854–863, 128 pages, softcover, February 2011)

References

External links

 
 
Question at Don Markstein's Toonopedia. Archived from the original on November 4, 2016
 International Catalog of Superheroes entry on the Question
 Article on the history/legacy of the Question from the Comics 101 article series by Scott Tipton.
 Alan Moore interview at TwoMorrows that discusses (among other things) the Question, Steve Ditko, and Charlton Comics.
 The Question's secret origin on dccomics.com

1987 comics debuts
Charlton Comics superheroes
Comics by Steve Ditko
DC Comics martial artists
DC Comics superheroes
DC Comics male superheroes
DC Comics titles
Comics characters introduced in 1967
Fictional characters from Chicago
Fictional detectives
Fictional reporters
Characters created by Steve Ditko
Question (DC Comics)
Vigilante characters in comics